X39 may refer to:

General Electric X39, nuclear-powered General Electric J47 turbojet
X-39, aircraft designation is reserved for use with the Future Aircraft Technology Enhancements (FATE) program by the USAF

de:X-39
it:X-39
nl:X-39